Echo (Maya Lopez) is a fictional character appearing in American comic books published by Marvel Comics. The adoptive daughter of the Kingpin, the character has been depicted as a supporting character of Daredevil. A Native American (of the Cheyenne Nation) and one of the few deaf comic characters, her "Echo" guise includes a white handprint that covers most of her face.

Alaqua Cox portrays Maya Lopez in the Marvel Cinematic Universe, debuting in the television series Hawkeye (2021), and will be starring in her own upcoming spin-off series Echo (2023).

Publication history
Echo first appeared in Daredevil #9 (Dec. 1999), created by writer David Mack and artist Joe Quesada. She first appeared as Ronin in The New Avengers #11 (Nov. 2005), created by writer Brian Michael Bendis and artist David Finch. The Ronin identity was an attempt by Bendis to create a mystery after the apparently male character was depicted on several comic book covers, including issues of The New Avengers and one The Pulse issue. Fan speculation was high, with the most common guess that Ronin was Matt Murdock; Bendis eventually revealed this to be the original intention despite initially denying that this was the case. However, Avengers: The Ultimate Guide revealed Ronin to be Maya Lopez weeks before the slightly delayed release of The New Avengers #13, where Ronin's true identity was belatedly revealed.

Fictional character biography

Maya Lopez was a young girl when her father Willie "Crazy Horse" Lincoln was killed by the Kingpin (Wilson Fisk). Crazy Horse dies, leaving a bloody handprint on Maya's face and a last dying wish: that the Kingpin raise Maya well. Kingpin honors his dying wish, caring for her as his own daughter. Believed to be mentally disabled, Maya is sent to an expensive school for people with learning disabilities. There, she manages to completely replicate a song on the piano. She is subsequently sent to another expensive school for prodigies.

Echo
Maya is sent by the Kingpin to prove Matt Murdock's weakness, telling her that Matt believes Fisk is a bad person and that she is the only way to prove him wrong. As Maya believes Fisk, it would not appear to be a lie when she tells Matt.

Murdock and Maya soon fall in love. She later takes on the "Echo" guise to hunt down Daredevil. On her face, she paints a white handprint, similar to the bloody handprint left by her dying father. Maya proves more than a match for Daredevil, having watched videos of Daredevil and Bullseye fighting. After several failed attempts, noticing that Daredevil can easily move through the dark, Maya easily figures out Daredevil's weakness and exploits this by having a fight in a place where Daredevil's heightened senses are useless. Maya easily takes down Daredevil and nearly kills the vigilante, refusing only when she finds out Matt and Daredevil are one and the same. Matt manages to expose the Kingpin's lies. In revenge, Maya confronts and shoots Fisk in the face, blinding Fisk and starting the chain of events that lead to the man's eventual downfall (Kingpin later partially recovered eyesight through reconstructive eye surgery).

After realizing the horror of her actions and the lies with which she has grown up, Maya flees the United States to do some soul-searching. When she comes back, she tries reuniting with Murdock, only to find out Matt is now with a blind woman and that the Kingpin is still alive (despite Maya's attempts). Leaving Matt, Maya visits the Kingpin in prison who tells her that she doesn't get blamed for what she did, and (that despite all that had happened) the Kingpin still loves her like a daughter. Unsatisfied and still needing peace, Maya turns to the Chief (her father's old friend) noted for wisdom. The Chief sends Maya on a vision quest to calm her soul. On her quest, she meets and befriends Wolverine who helps her recover and passes on knowledge of Japanese culture and Japanese organized crime. Soon enough, Maya makes peace with her past and is back doing performance art.

Ronin and the Avengers
 After a recent identity crisis and feeling unable to join the New Avengers due to a refusal to tarnish the reputations of heroes by working alongside them, Maya dons a suit that conceals her identity as well as her gender and rechristens herself Ronin (Japanese for "wanderer", a class of masterless samurai).

Daredevil recommends Maya to Captain America to aid the Avengers in seizing the Silver Samurai in Japan. After joining the Avengers, Maya returns to Japan to keep an eye on dangerous assassin Elektra Natchios rumored to be leading the Hand, check on the Silver Samurai from time to time, and hopefully solve the conflict between The Hand and Clan Yashida. Around the conclusion of the Civil War between the pro-registration and anti-registration factions in America, Maya fights Elektra and is killed, but is soon resurrected by the Hand with the same process used to raise Elektra. Maya is taken captive with the intent of turning her into an assassin for The Hand. Luke Cage, Spider-Man, Wolverine, Doctor Strange, Spider-Woman, Iron Fist, and the new Ronin rescue her and escape, leaving Elektra to furiously send the Hand after them. During a brief lull in the fight with the Hand in which Luke tries to negotiate with Elektra to buy time, it is revealed that the Hand has been successful in brainwashing Maya, as she subsequently stabs Dr. Strange with a sword given to her by one of the Hand. She continues to fight the New Avengers until Dr. Strange is able to release an astral form with Wong's help, and frees Maya from the brainwashing. Maya then charges straight for Elektra (who is fighting Luke) and stabs her, revealing that Elektra is a Skrull warrior in disguise. They return to New York, after Spider-Woman's apparent betrayal of stealing Elektra's Skrull impersonator's corpse. The Avengers hide in a hotel room (Strange's magic making it appear that Maya is the only person in the room) before returning to Strange's Sanctum Sanctorum. Maya officially hands the Ronin identity over to Clint Barton after they arrive. After Strange confirms their identities by casting a spell that shows everyone their true nature - Maya appearing dressed in a female variation of Daredevil's costume - the team heads to Stark Tower to stop the Hood's attack on the building. There, they encounter the Mighty Avengers locked in battle with an army of invading symbiotes, one of which latches on to Maya before Iron Man manages to cure those infected.

World War Hulk
Echo attempts to defend Rick Jones from Hiroim and Elloe of the Hulk's Warbound during their attack on the Sanctum Sanctorum to capture Doctor Strange. She, along with Iron Fist and Barton, is defeated and captured.

Avengers/Invaders
During the Invaders' appearance in the present due to D'Spayre's manipulations acquiring a Cosmic Cube, Echo proved vital in defeating the villain as her deafness meant that D'Spayre was unable to manipulate her emotions.

Secret Invasion: The Infiltration
After the defeat of the Hood's criminal organization, Echo remains on the team as Doctor Strange departs to the astral plane to heal himself, setting up base in a building owned by Iron Fist's company but technically leased to Samuel Sterns for the year. After a brief run-in with a Skrull disguised as Daredevil, Barton admits being attracted to her, and the two sleep together.

Secret Invasion
Echo goes with the rest of the New Avengers to the Savage Land when a Skrull ship crash lands. When the ship opens, it reveals various superheroes in outdated outfits. Echo joins with the Mighty Avengers and New Avengers to fight the "old" heroes from the Skrull ship. The battle is then broken up by a dinosaur causing everyone to split up. Later, she encounters "Spider-Woman" who is actually the Skrull Queen and the force behind the Skrull Invasion. "Spider-Woman" incapacitates Echo by repeatedly blasting her with venom blasts and then slams her into a nearby tree trunk. Echo helps the other Avengers kill all the other Skrull impostors, then heads to New York and confronts an army of Super Skrulls along with various other heroes and villains. She is invited back to Captain America's apartment by Iron Fist but does not show up.

Heroic Age
Following the reformation of the New Avengers during the Heroic Age, Cage and Jessica Jones seek a nanny for their child; Echo is one of several respondents to the offer, but declines and then angrily asks if Cage even remembers that she used to be a member of the Avengers.

Moon Knight
Echo appears in the fourth Moon Knight series, where she worked undercover in a strip club in L.A., until she blew the cover saving Marc Spector. Moon Knight later proposes that they join forces against the West Coast Kingpin, and invites her to dinner. Moon Knight is obviously attracted to Echo and it is suggested that Echo feels the same, despite punching Moon Knight in the face for kissing her. When she meets up with Moon Knight, they are attacked by the Night Shift. Although Echo and Moon Knight beat them, the police arrive, and attempt to apprehend the duo as well. Echo is killed by Count Nefaria, the man trying to be the new West Coast Kingpin.

Resurrection
Mysterious circumstances later lead to Maya's resurrection. During her first team-up with Daredevil since her return, she helps save New York from a sonic virus created by Klaw.

Captain Marvel
Echo later aids Captain Marvel and her friends against Radioactive Man.

Enter the Phoenix
During the Enter the Phoenix crossover, Echo is chosen by the Phoenix Force to participate in her tournament alongside many other heroes and villains to decide her next host. Along with the other champions, Echo is empowered by a spark of the Phoenix's cosmic fire and is pitted against Namor in an underwater match.  Due to the vast disadvantage, Echo is soundly defeated by Namor, presumably eliminating her from the tournament and losing her portion of the Phoenix's power. However, despite her loss, Echo's despair and refusal to die draws the Phoenix to her, making her the new host of the entity. After taking the Phoenix's power from the remaining participants and brutally beating Namor as payback for her earlier defeat, Maya declares herself as the new Thunderbird and fully bonds with the entity.  Maya is telepathically congratulated by the Phoenix's previous host, Jean Grey, who also gives her words of advice on controlling the entity's power.

Powers and abilities
Maya Lopez is an Olympic-level athlete possessing "photographic reflexes" or the uncanny ability to perfectly copy other people's movements, similar to that of the Taskmaster. Just by watching other people, she has become a concert-level pianist, a strong martial artist, a highly skilled acrobat, and a gifted ballerina (and on one occasion even piloted a Quinjet for a few minutes). In addition, she has also gained Daredevil's acrobatic abilities and Bullseye's uncanny aim after watching tapes of their fights. Along with great potential, deafness gives great drawbacks. Her absolute reliance on visual cues renders her helpless in the dark, and her ability to communicate by reading lips prevents her from taking oral commands and communicating with people who are wearing masks or are not in direct visual contact; when she initially meets the Avengers, Captain America has to repeat all of Iron Man's questions for her. However, she has been incorrectly depicted as being able to hear and respond to voices despite not seeing the person's mouth due to standing away from them or the person talking right behind her. It has since been established that Echo actually can read lips from some distance or with the corner of her eye even if the talker is wearing a mask if the mask is thin enough (as the rather simple fabric masks used by Clint Barton and Spider-Man), and relay their conversation to closer individuals. She still retains her inability to communicate with people wearing sturdier or thicker masks or fully covering their mouths.

As Thunderbird, Maya gains the abilities offered to her as a host of the Phoenix Force, which includes telepathy, flight, superhuman strength, and the ability to generate flames of cosmic energy.

Reception

Accolades 

 In 2020, CBR.com ranked Echo 3rd in their "Marvel Comics: 10 Deadliest Hand to Hand Fighters (Who Are Female)" list, 5th in their "Every Member Of The Daughters Of Liberty" list, and 12th in their "13 Most Powerful Hispanic Heroes In Marvel Comics" list.
 In 2020, Scary Mommy included Echo in their "Looking For A Role Model? These 195+ Marvel Female Characters Are Truly Heroic" list.
 In 2022, CBR.com ranked Echo 4th in their "All Of Moon Knight's Love Interests" list.

Literary reception

Volumes

Phoenix Song: Echo - 2021 
According to Diamond Comic Distributors, Phoenix Song: Echo #1 was the 59th best selling comic book in October 2021.

Dustin Hilland of CBR.com called Phoenix Song: Echo #1 an "enthralling first issue that sets the stage for a thrilling and complex new series," stating, "Phoenix Song: Echo #1 introduces several sources of tension in Echo's life and hints at the beginnings of a few different confrontations of epic proportions. But this comic's strength lies in the intimidating and fascinating character that Roanhorse and Maresca are developing in Echo. Her struggle to maintain her identity while harnessing the power of the Phoenix Force seems to be propelling this series into new and exciting directions." Matthew Aguilar of Comicbook.com gave Phoenix Song: Echo #1 a grade of 3.5 out of 5, writing, "If Phoenix Song: Echo continues the momentum of this issue's second half and delivers on the promise it holds, we could have an amazing series on our hands. If it stays at the surface, it could still be enjoyable, but it won't come near to what it could be. Here's hoping the former is true because all of the elements are here for Phoenix Song: Echo to be something truly special."

Other versions

Daredevil: End of Days
An older Maya Lopez appears in the miniseries Daredevil: End of Days, now retired from the Avengers and working as a college professor. She is later interviewed by Ben Urich for a story about Matt Murdock's death.

"Heroes Reborn"
In an alternate reality depicted in the 2021 miniseries Heroes Reborn, Maya Lopez was empowered by the Phoenix Force and imprisoned in Ravencroft Asylum before Blade and Captain America break her out to help them restore their reality. She later recruits Thor to help them further before the Avengers confront the Squadron Supreme of America. After eventually defeating the Squadron, Lopez and Star Brand use their powers in conjunction with the Pandemonium Cube to restore reality to how it was previously.

Ultimate Marvel
The Ultimate Marvel version of Echo makes a cameo in Ultimate Spider-Man #122, appearing in a police station shouting "Who can you trust? WHO CAN YOU TRUST?!", referencing Brian Bendis' frequent use of the character in New Avengers and Secret Invasion.

In other media

Television
 Echo makes a cameo appearance in the Ultimate Spider-Man episodes  "Agent Venom" and "The Next Iron Spider" as one of several young superheroes who were inspired by Spider-Man and monitored by S.H.I.E.L.D.
 Maya Lopez appears in television series set in the Marvel Cinematic Universe, portrayed by Alaqua Cox as an adult and by Darnell Besaw as a child. This version is the leader of the Tracksuit Mafia, with Kazimierz "Kazi" Kazimierczak (portrayed by Fra Fee) serving as her second-in-command and ASL interpreter, and sports a prosthetic leg since childhood.
 She debuted in the live-action Disney+ series Hawkeye (2021). In flashbacks, her father William Lopez (portrayed by Zahn McClarnon) was killed by Ronin. In the present, she seeks revenge on Ronin and initially targets Kate Bishop, who inadvertently wore the Ronin suit to fight off Lopez's men, before setting her sights on Clint Barton. However, she learns Barton was tasked by an informant working for Lopez's boss with killing her father and becomes suspicious of Kazi, who was absent the night of her father's murder. After killing Kazi, she confronts her adoptive father and boss Kingpin.
 Echo, a spin-off series centered on Lopez, was announced in March 2021 to be in early development for Disney+, with Cox reprising her role and Etan Cohen and Emily Cohen initially set to write and executive produce respectively. Marion Dayre was later announced in November 2021 to be set to write and executive produce. The series was officially announced in November 2021.

Video games
 Echo appears as a boss in the film tie-in game Daredevil. This version is a villain who believes that the titular character was never in league with the Kingpin. After chasing Echo throughout the New York City Subway system, Daredevil defeats her.
 Maya Lopez as Ronin appears as an unlockable playable character in the PSP version of Marvel Ultimate Alliance, voiced by Marabina Jaimes. An unmasked variant and her Echo persona appear as alternate costumes while she also appears as an unlockable character in the Wii version via a mod.
 Echo appears as an unlockable playable character in Lego Marvel's Avengers, voiced by Tonantzin Carmelo.

Novels
Maya Lopez appears in Spider-Man: Hostile Takeover, a prequel novel to the video game Spider-Man. This version is raised to believe Spider-Man killed her father and plots with the Kingpin and Blood Spider to seek revenge. However, Spider-Man proves that Kingpin killed her father, which leads to her allying with Spider-Man. She provides evidence to incriminate the Kingpin, enabling a prosecution and leading into the video game's events.

References

External links

Avengers (comics) characters
Characters created by Joe Quesada
Comics characters introduced in 1999
Daredevil (Marvel Comics) characters
Fictional Cheyenne people
Fictional deaf characters
Fictional Native American people in comics
Fictional Native American women
Fictional women soldiers and warriors
Marvel Comics martial artists
Marvel Comics female superheroes